Medieval Manipur may refer to:
 Medieval Kangleipak
 Medieval Ages of Manipur, Dahanu